Blepharospasm is any abnormal contraction of the orbicularis oculi muscle. The condition should be distinguished from the more common, and milder, involuntary quivering of an eyelid, known as myokymia, or fasciculation. In most cases, blepharospasm symptoms last for a few days and then disappear without treatment, but in some cases the twitching is chronic and persistent, causing life-long challenges. In these cases, the symptoms are often severe enough to result in functional blindness. The person's eyelids feel like they are clamping shut and will not open without great effort. People have normal eyes, but for periods of time are effectively blind due to their inability to open their eyelids. In contrast, the reflex blepharospasm is due to any pain in and around the eye.

It is of two types: essential and reflex blepharospasm. The benign essential blepharospasm (BEB) is a focal dystonia—a neurological movement disorder involving involuntary and sustained contractions of the muscles around the eyes. The term essential indicates that the cause is unknown, but fatigue, stress, or an irritant are possible contributing factors. Blepharospasm is sometimes part of benign fasciculation syndrome.

Although there is no cure, botulinum toxin injections may help temporarily. A surgical procedure known as myectomy may also be useful. BEB is a fairly rare disease, affecting only one in every 20,000 people in the United States. The word is from Greek: βλέφαρον / blepharon, eyelid, and σπασμός / spasmos, spasm, an uncontrolled muscle contraction.

Signs and symptoms
 Excessive blinking and spasming of one or both eyes – characterized by uncontrollable eyelid closure of durations longer than the typical blink reflex. The spells of spasming may last for minutes or even hours
 Uncontrollable contractions or twitches of the eye muscles and surrounding facial area. Some sufferers have twitching symptoms that radiate into the nose, face, cheeks, and sometimes, the neck area
 Dryness of the eyes
 Sensitivity to the sun and bright light

Causes
Some causes of blepharospasm have been identified; however, the causes of many cases of blepharospasm remain unknown. Some people with blepharospasm have a history of dry eyes, light sensitivity, and even fatigue. Others report no eye problems before onset of symptoms.

Some drugs can induce blepharospasm, such as those used to treat Parkinson's disease, as well as hormone treatments, including estrogen-replacement therapy for women going through menopause. Blepharospasm can also be a symptom of acute withdrawal from benzodiazepines. Prolonged use of benzodiazepines can induce blepharospasm and is a known risk factor for the development of blepharospasm.

Blepharospasm may also come from abnormal functioning of the brain's basal ganglia. Simultaneous dry eye and dystonias such as Meige's syndrome have been observed. Blepharospasms can be caused by concussions in some rare cases, when a blow to the back of the head damages the basal ganglia.

Multiple sclerosis can cause blepharospasm.

Treatment
Drug therapy for blepharospasm has proved generally unpredictable and short-termed. Anticholinergics, tranquillizing drugs and botulinum toxin are the mostly used therapeutic options. However serious side effects can be observed as well as failure of therapy. It is therefore not surprising that new therapies are constantly being tested. In this backdrop new evidence shows Mosapride can be a safe and affordable therapeutic option for blepharospasm.

Botulinum toxin injections have been used to induce localized, partial paralysis. Among most sufferers, botulinum toxin injection is the preferred treatment method. Injections are generally administered every three months, with variations based on patient response and usually give almost immediate relief (though for some it may take more than a week) of symptoms from the muscle spasms. Most patients can resume a relatively normal life with regular botulinum toxin treatments. A minority of sufferers develop minimal or no result from botulinum toxin injections and have to find other treatments. For some, botulinum toxin diminishes in its effectiveness after many years of use. An observed side effect in a minority of patients is ptosis or eyelid droop. Attempts to inject in locations that minimize ptosis can result in diminished ability to control spasms. A recent Cochrane systematic review showed that a single treatment session (where both eyelids were injected with BtA multiple times) alleviated the symptoms of blepharospasm, disability, and number of involuntary movements.

People that do not respond well to medication or botulinum toxin injection are candidates for surgical therapy. The most effective surgical treatment has been protractor myectomy, the removal of muscles responsible for eyelid closure.

Since the root of the problem is neurological, doctors have explored sensorimotor retraining activities to enable the brain to "rewire" itself and eliminate dystonic movements. The work of Joaquin Farias has shown that sensorimotor retraining activities and proprioceptive stimulation can induce neuroplasticity, making it possible for patients to recover substantial function that was lost due to blepharospasm.

Developed by The Eye Research Group Oxford, PressOp™ is a new ethically approved spectacle mounted device that arose after studying individuals with Blepharospasm who regularly use “sensory tricks”. By applying pressure to the temple region of their forehead patients found this helped to enable eye opening. The device is particularly helpful controlling an episode of severe spasm when the carrying out of specific tasks is necessary. Blepharospasm sufferers may find continuity in their quality of life by using the device while effectiveness of treatment is not at its peak.

See also
 Levator palpebrae superioris muscle
 Myokymia
 Fasciculation

References

External links

 Blepharospasm – Resource Guide from the National Eye Institute (NEI)

Extrapyramidal and movement disorders
Dystonia
Disorders of eyelid, lacrimal system and orbit